Twitchell Lake may refer to:

Twitchell Lake (New York), a lake in New York
Twitchell Reservoir, a reservoir in California